The Three Turnings of the Wheel (of Dharma) refers to a framework for understanding the sutra stream of the teachings of the Buddhism originally devised by the Yogachara school. It later became prevalent in modified form in Tibetan Buddhism and related traditions.

The distinction is, on the one hand, a historic or quasi-historic scheme by which the Buddha's first sermons, as recorded in the Pali Canon and the Tripiṭaka of early Buddhist schools, constitute the First Turning, and the later Mahayana sutras comprise the Second and Third turnings. The schema appears in the Samdhinirmochana Sutra, a central Yogachara text, although it may predate it.

The model of three turnings of the 'Wheel' is an attempt to categorize the content, philosophical view, and practical application of the whole array of Buddhist sutrayana teachings. In East Asian Buddhism, this classification system was expanded and modified into different doctrinal classifications called 教判 jiàopan which were developed by different Chinese Buddhist schools.

Contents of the Three Turnings
The basic content and audience of the three turnings of the wheel can be summarized as follows:

First Turning
The first turning is traditionally said to have taken place at Deer Park in Sarnath near Varanasi in northern India, to an audience of shravakas. It consisted of the teaching of the Four Noble Truths (Sanskrit: catvāry āryasatyāni) and the other elements of the Tripitaka – the Abhidharma, Sutrapitaka and Vinaya. The Abhidharma referred to is the Abhidharma Pitaka of the Sarvastivada school, which is a later composition not taught by the Buddha, and contains philosophy which is antithetical, one may say, to the early teachings.

Second Turning
The second turning is said to have taken place at Vulture Peak Mountain in Rajagriha, in Bihar, India. The audience comprised bodhisattvas; in some telling there were also shravaka arhats there as well.  In the second turning, the emphasis is on emptiness (Skt: śūnyatā) as epitomized in the Prajnaparamita sutras, and on compassion. These two elements form bodhicitta, the epitome of the second turning. The Madhyamika school that Nagarjuna founded arose from his exegesis of the early texts and is included under the second turning. Nagarjuna attacked the metaphysics of the Sarvastivada school and a school which broke away from it called Sautrantika, and promoted, among other things, the classical emphasis on the dependent arising of phenomena of the early texts.

Third Turning
The first sutra source which mentions the "three turnings" is the Ārya-saṃdhi-nirmocana-sūtra or Noble sūtra of the Explanation of the Profound Secrets, the most foundational sutra of the Yogācāra school. The sūtra affirms that the earlier turnings while being authentic are also flawed or incomplete and require interpretation. The Saṃdhi-nirmocana further claims that its teachings are the ultimate and final truth. Major ideas include the basis-consciousness (ālaya-vijñāna), and the doctrine of cognition-only (vijñapti-mātra) and the "three natures" (trisvabhāva).

Some Buddhist traditions also consider the Tathāgatagarbha (also known as Buddha nature) teachings as part of this turning. This was elaborated on in great detail by Maitreya via Asanga in the Five Treatises of Maitreya, which are also generally grouped under the third turning. The Yogachara school reoriented later refinements, in all their complexity, so as to accord with the doctrines of earliest Buddhism.

In Tibetan Buddhism, Buddhist tantra and its associated scriptures are sometimes considered to also be part of the third turning.

Other similar classifications

Fourth Turning
Vajrayana schools sometimes refer to Buddhist tantra as the "fourth turning." As explained by Lama Surya Das, some traditions consider Dzogchen as a fourth turning.

Sanron school 
According to Japanese scholar Junjirō Takakusu, the Sanron (Sanlun) Madhyamaka school divided the teaching into three dharmacakras as well, but with different definitions for each:

 The root wheel of the Avatamsaka sutra.
 The branch wheel of Hinayana and Mahayana texts.
 The wheel that contracts all branches so as to bring them back to the root, the Lotus sutra.

Tiantai 
The Chinese Tiantai school organized the Buddhas teachings into five periods (五時):

 Flower Ornament period 華嚴時, The sudden teaching is delivered as the Avatamsaka sutra, containing the direct content of the Buddha’s enlightenment experience. Few can understand it.
 Deer Park period 鹿苑時 (represented by the Āgama sūtras 阿含經), represent a gradual and simpler teaching.
 the Vaipulya period 方等時 (represented by the Vimalakīrti Sūtra 淨名經 and so forth); this and the next period represent gradually deeper teachings. 
 the Prajñā period 般若時 (represented by the Prajñāpāramitā sūtras 般若經). 
 Lotus-Nirvāṇa period 法華涅槃時, Lotus sutra and Mahāparinirvāṇa-sūtra, a teaching that is neither sudden nor gradual.

Huayen 
Likewise, the Huayen school had a five period system of dharma teachings:

 The Hinayana-teachings, especially the Sarvastivadins
 The Mahayana-teachings, including Yogacara, Madhyamaka
 The "Final Teachings", based on the Tathagatagarbha-teachings, especially the Awakening of Faith
 The Sudden Teaching, "which 'revealed' (hsien) rather than verbalised the teaching"
 The Complete, or Perfect, Teachings of the Avatamsaka-sutra and the Hua-yen school.

Definitive and provisional
The schema of the three turnings is found in Yogachara and Tathāgatagarbha texts such as the Saṃdhinirmocana Sūtra and the Srimala Sutra and likely originated in the Yogachara literature. Naturally, they identify themselves as definitive. However, the schema was later adopted more widely, and different sects and schools of Buddhism, as well as individual Buddhist teachers and philosophers give different explanations as to whether the second or third turnings is 'definitive' (Skt: nitartha) or 'provisional' (Skt: neyartha) or requiring interpretation. In the Tibetan tradition, the Gelug school considers the second turning definitive, as do some scholars in other schools.

See also
Dhammacakkapavattana Sutta
Dharmacakra
Saṃdhinirmocana Sūtra

References

External links
The Three Turnings of The Wheel of Dharma – Why They Are Each Essential to All of Us – Jay L. Garfield
Three Turnings of the Wheel of the Dharma – James Blumenthal

3 Three Turnings of the Wheel of Dharma